The Men's 100m T46 had its first round held on September 14 at 17:05 and the Final on September 15 at 10:24.

Medalists

Results

References
Round 1 - Heat 1
Round 1 - Heat 2
Round 1 - Heat 3
Final

Athletics at the 2008 Summer Paralympics